Yamki is a rural locality (a village) in Styopantsevskoye Rural Settlement, Vyaznikovsky District, Vladimir Oblast, Russia. The population was 4 as of 2010.

Geography 
Yamki is located 32 km southwest of Vyazniki (the district's administrative centre) by road. Senino is the nearest rural locality.

References 

Rural localities in Vyaznikovsky District